Pediomorphus is a genus of beetles in the family Carabidae first described by Maximilien Chaudoir in 1878.

Species 
Pediomorphus contains the following thirteen species:

 Pediomorphus crenulatus Will, 2019
 Pediomorphus elongatus Sloane, 1898
 Pediomorphus macleayi Sloane, 1900
 Pediomorphus maximus Will, 2019
 Pediomorphus minor Will, 2019
 Pediomorphus obtusus Will, 2019
 Pediomorphus planiusculus Chaudoir, 1878
 Pediomorphus punctatus Will, 2019
 Pediomorphus robustus Will, 2019
 Pediomorphus ruficollis Sloane, 1900
 Pediomorphus semilaevis Will, 2019
 Pediomorphus storeyi Will, 2019
 Pediomorphus variabilis (Straneo, 1960)

References

Pterostichinae